Strom Cronan Thacker is an American political scientist and academic administrator. He is expected to take office as the seventh president of Pitzer College in July 2023. As a scholar, his work focuses on the political economy of development in Latin America and other regions of the world.

Books

References

Presidents of Pitzer College
American political scientists
Living people
Political economists
Pomona College alumni
University of North Carolina at Chapel Hill alumni
Year of birth missing (living people)